Yang Jie (born 1 March 1994 in Hebei), she is the team member of China women's national volleyball team which position is opposite and outside hitter. She participated at the 2011 Montreux Volley Masters. and 2011 FIVB Volleyball Women's World Cup.

She's now plays for Shanghai. At Shanghai, she plays outside hitter.

References

External links
FIVB Profile

Chinese women's volleyball players
Living people
1994 births
Volleyball players from Shanghai
Asian Games medalists in volleyball
Volleyball players at the 2010 Asian Games
Asian Games gold medalists for China
Medalists at the 2010 Asian Games
Outside hitters
21st-century Chinese women